Hokes Bluff High School is a public high school in Hokes Bluff, Alabama, United States. It is a part of Etowah County Schools.

History
Hokes Bluff High School was created in 1935.

Athletics 
The following sports are offered at Hokes Bluff:

 Baseball
 Basketball
 Bowling
 Cross country
 Football
 Golf
 Softball
 Track and field
 Volleyball

Facilities
The campus of Hokes Bluff High School consists of a 32,000 square foot main building with one gym and an agriculture building along with baseball, football and softball fields.

Notable alumni
 Isaac Haas, NCAA basketball player for Purdue University

References

External links
 

Schools in Etowah County, Alabama
Public high schools in Alabama
Educational institutions established in 1935
1935 establishments in Alabama